
Year 782 (DCCLXXXII) was a common year starting on Tuesday  of the Julian calendar. The denomination 782 for this year has been used since the early medieval period, when the Anno Domini calendar era became the prevalent method in Europe for naming years.

Events 
 By place 

 Abbasid Empire 
 Arab–Byzantine War: Arab forces (95,000 men) under Harun al-Rashid, son of the Abbasid caliph Al-Mahdi, cross the Taurus Mountains and capture the Byzantine border fortress of Magida. Harun leaves his lieutenant Al-Rabi' ibn Yunus to besiege the city of Nakoleia (Phrygia), while another force (30,000 men), probably under Yahya ibn Khalid, is sent to raid the western coastlands of Asia Minor. Harun himself, with the main army, advances to the Opsician Theme. 
 Summer – Harun al-Rashid reaches as far as Chrysopolis, across the Bosporus Straits from the Byzantine capital, Constantinople. After the defection of the Armenian general Tatzates, Empress Irene accepts a three-year truce, including the annual payment of a tribute of 70,000 or 90,000 gold dinars, and the handing over of 10,000 silk garments. Harun releases all his captives (5,600 men), including chief minister Staurakios and other hostages.
 Byzantine Empire 
 Emperor Constantine VI is betrothed to the 6-year-old Rotrude, daughter of Charlemagne; Irene sends a scholar monk called Elisaeus to educate her in Greek language and manners.

 Europe 
 Summer – Saxon Wars: King Charlemagne sends a punitive expedition (an elite force of Eastern Frankish troops) under the command of Adalgis the Chamberlain, Gallo, and Worad, supported by Saxon forces, to deal with the Saxons and Sorb raiders in Thuringia.
 Battle of Süntel: The Franks under Charlemagne are defeated by Saxon rebels, led by Widukind. He succeeds in wiping out more than half of the occupying Frankish forces and again raises the banner of revolt.
 Autumn – Charlemagne returns from his campaign in Italy, and musters a Frankish army of available troops in Bavaria. He then marches to Saxony, probably to Eresburg. Charlemagne marches north, down the Weser to the Aller River, making camp near Verden.
 Massacre of Verden: Charlemagne executes 4,500 rebel Saxons at Verden for practicing paganism. He issues the Capitulatio de partibus Saxoniae and imposes Christianity on the Saxons, making Saxony a Frankish province.
 Charlemagne summons Alcuin, Anglo-Saxon missionary, to Aachen, and appoints him as chief adviser on religious and educational matters. He becomes the leading scholar and teacher at the Carolingian court.

 By topic 

 Religion 
 Nanchan Temple on  Wutaishan, Shanxi, is built during the Tang Dynasty (China).

Births 
 Tachibana no Hayanari, Japanese calligrapher (d. 844)

Deaths 
 January 11 – Kōnin, emperor of Japan (b. 709)
 September 28 – Leoba, Anglo-Saxon nun 
 Conall mac Fidhghal, king of Uí Maine (Ireland)
 Thierry IV, Frankish nobleman (approximate date)

References

Sources